Artur Avanesov (born December 9, 1980 in Moscow, Russia) is an Armenian composer of chamber, choral, vocal, and piano works that have been performed in Armenia and abroad.

Career 
Avanesov studied piano at various music schools in Baku, Kapan and Yerevan as a child, and studied music theory at the Alexander Spendiaryan Specialised Music School in Yerevan from 1994–97. He studied composition with Stepan Rostomyan and piano with Elena Abajyan at the Komitas State Conservatory of Yerevan from 2000–02 and earned his doctorate in musicology in 2005.

As a pianist, he has performed with musicians such as Rohan de Saram, Kim Kashkashian, Anja Lechner, Tony Arnold, and many others. His compositions have been performed in many countries including Europe, CIS countries, United States, Japan, Taiwan, Canada, Brazil, and the Middle East.

Among his honours are co-First Prize in the Benjamin Britten competition in Yerevan (2003, for Namu-Amida-Butsu) and co-First Prize in the Ghazaros Saryan competition for vocal music in Yerevan (2004, for Garun a – Spring).

Avanesov has taught composition at the Komitas State Conservatory of Yerevan since 2005.

His writings have appeared in many journals in Armenia and he has served as co-editor of the magazine Musical Armenia since 2002, where he has published articles on the music of Stockhausen and several contemporary Armenian composers. He is also the co-founder of the AUS Contemporary Music Ensemble (formed in 2001), which performs works of young and established composers from Armenia and abroad.

Major works

Chamber music 
 Four Pieces, string quartet, 1996
 Namu-Amida-Butsu, flute, piano, 2001
 ...dies ist ein lied für dich allein... (cellist also sings text by Stefan George; performer must be male), cello, 2003
 webcrossings.ch-am, flute, oboe, bass clarinet, 2004
 ...leise..., clarinet, piano, 2004

Choral 
 Et resurrexit, 12 mixed voices, 1999
 Kyrie eleison, male chorus, 2000
 Christe eleison, soprano, male chorus, 2001
 Te decet hymnus, mixed chorus, 2001
 Requiem æternam, tenor, mixed chorus, 2 flutes ad libitum, 2 oboes ad libitum, piano, timpani, 42 strings, 2002
 Kyrie II, male chorus, 2002
 Lungi da te cor mio (text by Luzzasco Luzzaschi), mixed chorus, 2004
 Miserere, mixed chorus, 2007

Vocal 
 Cinq Haïkaï (texts by Matsuo Bashō, Rinka Ono [Armenian translations]), female voice, piano, 1996
 Two Gazelles of Yeghishe Charents, female voice, flute, oboe, French horn, violin, cello, piano, 2 percussion, 1997
 ...and the moon is like shadow under your feet... (text by Vardan Areveltsi), female voice, piano, 1998 (also version for female voice, 1998)
 Les douze couleurs d'Alleluja, alto, 2002
 ...i have tried to write paradise... (text by Ezra Pound), mezzo-soprano/countertenor, string quartet, 2003
 Garun a (text from a folksong from Armenia), mezzo-soprano, piano, 2003
 Wieder (text by Rose Ausländer), male voice, piano, 2005
 Im Luys – My Light (text from a folk source from Armenia), soprano, violin, 2005
 A Handful of Fire (text from a folksong from Armenia), soprano, piano, 2006
 ...zij lijkt op een vreemde bloem... (text by Krikor Momdjian; pianist also sings and must be male), mezzo-soprano, cello, piano, 2007

Piano 
 Three Preludes, 1996
 Ave Sancta, 1997
 In memoriam T. Takemitsu, 1998
 Et in sæcula sæculorum, 2 pianos, 1999
 Un peu de musique pour S., 2000
 Illa, 1999–2001
 Deux Énigmes, 2002
 Malinconia in fis, 2005
 No lloro, 2005
 Feux follets (cycle), 2007–

Harpsichord 
 Fenstern zu G-dur, 2002
 Musique triste, 2002

Film score 
 Words, Words, Words, 2005 (Raffie Davidian)

References 

1980 births
Living people
Armenian composers